Acacia inceana is a shrub or tree of the genus Acacia and the subgenus Plurinerves that is endemic to south western Australia.

Description
It has terete branchlets that can be glabrous or covered with fine downy hairs. Like most species of Acacia it has phyllodes rather than true leaves. The phyllodes narrow down to a delicate tip at the end that is normally curved and innocuous to pungent tip. The rigid and glabrous or finely haired phyllodes have many closely parallel and indistinct nerves. It blooms from August to September and produces yellow flowers. The simple inflorescences occur in pairs in the axils and have spherical flower-heads with a diameter of  containing 10 to 30 golden coloured flowers. After flowering thinly coriaceous seed pods form with a linear shape that are slightly raised over between each of the seeds.

Taxonomy
The species was first formally described by the botanist Karel Domin in 1923 as part of the work  New Additions to the Flora of Western Australia as published in Vestnik Kralovske Ceske Spolecnosti Nauk, Trida Matematiko-Prirodevedecke. It was reclassified as Racosperma inceanum by Leslie Pedley in 2003 then transferred back to genus Acacia in 2006. The only other synonym is Acacia inceae as described by Joseph Maiden and William Blakely in 1927.

There are three recognised subspecies:
 Acacia inceana subsp. conformis 
 Acacia inceana subsp. inceana 
 Acacia inceana subsp. latifolia

Distribution
It is native to an area in the Wheatbelt and Goldfields-Esperance regions of Western Australia where it is commonly situated along the margins of salt lakes and salt pans, on flats and plains growing in clay or red sandy soils. It is distributed from around Morawa in the north west down to around Hines Hill in the south east and out to the east as far as about Kalgoorlie as a part of scrubland or open woodland communities.

See also
List of Acacia species

References

inceana
Acacias of Western Australia
Taxa named by Karel Domin